Counterfeit electronic components are electronic parts whose origin or quality is deliberately misrepresented. Counterfeiting of electronic components can infringe the legitimate producer's trademark rights. Because counterfeit parts often have inferior specifications and/or quality, they may represent a hazard if incorporated into critical systems such as aircraft navigation, life support, military equipment, or space vehicles.

The marketing of electronic components has been commoditized, making it easier for the counterfeiter to introduce substandard and counterfeit devices into the supply chain.

Supply chain for electronic components
OCM (Original Component Manufacturers): Companies that design, market, and manufacture individual components
Franchise Distributor: Companies that are authorized to sell OCM material, governed by contracts.
Independent Distributor: Commonly known as electronic component "Brokers"
Wholesale Distributor: Companies that speculatively purchase excess inventories from component end-users and facilitate the redistribution of surplus, excess, and obsolete inventory

Market forces facilitating trends
According to a January 2010 study by the US Department of Commerce Bureau of Industry and Security, the number of counterfeit incidents reported grew from 3,868 in 2005 to 9,356 in 2008. Respondents to the survey cited the two most common types of counterfeit components were blatant fakes and used product re-marked as higher grade. This survey had 387 respondents representing all facets of the electronic component supply chain. All facets of the supply chain reported instances of counterfeit product. The World Semiconductor Trade Statistics estimates the global TAM for semiconductors will be in excess of $200 billion, thus the 387 respondents provide quantitative results for only a small portion of the total market.

This increase in instances of counterfeit products entering the supply chain has been made possible by fundamental changes to the supply chain for electronic components as characterized by the following:
Globalization
Dot-Com boom-Bust – The massive investment in telecommunications and data bandwidth during the dot-com bubble made communication tools and services available at a very low cost to business.
Outsourcing and off-shoring – The gradual shift of manufacturing from North American and Europe to the Far East facilitates technology transfer and awareness.
IT System interoperability – Adoption of the Windows operating system ensured that all computer users could easily and efficiently share information.
Global shipping companies – FedEx, UPS, and DHL refined their business offerings to provide relatively inexpensive shipping for small packages.
CHINA and the WTO
December 11, 2001, China was admitted to the WTO, which ultimately resulted in lifting the ban on exports by non-government-owned and controlled business entities.
Global e-waste handling
In late 1989, in response to public outcry against exporting and dumping of hazardous wastes from developed countries to developing countries, the Basel Convention was adopted in Basel, Switzerland. In the decades following this convention, most of the developed countries have adopted this convention, with the major exception of the US. During this period the United States has continued to export its hazardous e-waste to the developing world, primarily China, where e-waste recycling has become a way of life, despite its toxic effect on the people processing this waste. This e-waste provides the valuable raw materials for today's counterfeiter.

Examples and counterfeiting techniques
Non-functional units
Sanding and re-marking
Blacktopping and re-marking
Device substitution
Die salvaging
Manufacturing rejects
Component lead re-attachment
Relabeling boxes

These counterfeiting techniques are in constant improvement.

Counterfeit avoidance strategies

Procurement and inspection
By utilizing multiple different types of incoming inspection most counterfeit components can be discovered.
DNA marking. Botanical DNA as developed by Applied DNA Sciences and required by the DoD's Defense Logistics Agency for certain High Risk microcircuits to determine authenticity or provenance. Unique and un-copyable marks applied by manufacturer and/or distributor.
Visual external inspection for signs of resurfacing
Visual microscopic inspection of encapsulant finish and lead surfaces
X-Ray inspection
By comparing the internal structure (of a homogeneous sample, same date & lot code) of electronic components certain types of counterfeit parts can be discovered. The "blatant fake" counterfeit devices exhibit vast differences in internal structure including, but not limited to different die frames and different wire bonding.
X-RF Inspection
In the wake of the RoHS initiative, X-ray fluorescence spectroscopy can be used to confirm RoHS status which is often overlooked by counterfeiters.
Decapsulation
By removing the external packaging on a semiconductor and exposing the semiconductor wafer or die microscopic inspection of brand marks, trademarks, and laser die etching can be used to determine authenticity.
Chemical
Technique utilizing heated acid to expose wafer or die packaged in plastics or resins
Mechanical
Technique utilizing cutting, cracking, or chipping the ceramic or metal to expose wafer or die for inspection.
SAM (scanning acoustic microscopy)
A scanning acoustic microscope can be used to discover evidence of resurfacing and blacktopping by revealing laser etching below blacktop material
Parametric testing a.k.a. curve tracing
An inexpensive and expedient method to determine of a sample of product has identical electrical characteristics
Leak testing (gross leak and fine leak) of hermetically sealed components
Functional electrical testing
QPL - Qualified Product List (military product)
QML - Qualified Manufacturers List (military product)
QSLD - Qualified Suppliers List of Distributors (military product)
QTSL - Qualified Testing Suppliers List (military product)
Stereo microscope, metallurgical microscope
Solderability testing

Purchasing policies and procedures
As the instances of counterfeit and substandard products continue to increase, industry is beginning to address these issues through development and implementation of industry standards. As the majority of the counterfeit components were entering the supply chain though unknowing, unsophisticated, and unaware Independent Distributors (Component Brokers).

Continued work on awareness and industry standards continued with the formation of the G-19 Counterfeit Electronic Components Committee with representatives from all components of the supply chain. In April 2009 SAE International released AS5553 Counterfeit Electronic Parts; Avoidance, Detection, Mitigation, and Disposition.

SAE International (SAE), has implemented new standards to prevent the dangers associated with the growing threat of counterfeiting, as have other Independent Distributors. AS6081 was issued in November 2012 and was adopted by the DOD. This standard provides uniform requirements, practices, and methods to mitigate the risks of purchasing and supplying fraudulent or counterfeit electronic parts for distributors. This standard requires organizations involved with the purchase, acceptance, and distribution of such parts to have a quality management system in place, to communicate and document contract provisions that establish purchasing controls, and to retain appropriate records for supply chain traceability. In addition, AS6081 requires the purchased products to be verified through external visual inspections and radiological examinations.

While AS6081 covers distribution of components, AS5553A provides similar certification for manufacturers. Originally implemented in January 2013 in response to the increasing volume of fraudulent and counterfeit parts entering the aerospace supply chain, AS5553A was expanded to mitigate such risk on a global scale with regard to various sectors. Many of the requirements of AS5553A are similar to AS6081 and likewise aim to prevent the receipt and installation of fraudulent or counterfeit parts through uniform requirements, practices, and methods.

See also
Capacitor plague
Counterfeit consumer goods
Supply-chain security

References

Electrical components
Forgery